Wellspring Retreat and Resource Center is a Christian countercult movement-affiliated residential counseling center claiming to specialize in the treatment of individuals who they evaluate as "having been abused in relationships, cults, situations of trauma, and by destructive therapeutic alliances resulting in emotional betrayal and/or physical harm". Founded in 1986 by Dr. Paul R. Martin and his wife Barbara, it is located in Albany, Ohio.

All of the staff are Christian and "former members of cults".

Services
Wellspring claims that it has treated more than 500 former cult members from the United States and nine foreign countries since the retreat opened in 1986.

It also offers educational, consulting, and family support services. Several of its staff members are published authors, and Wellspring is also an informational resource to national and international media to raise awareness about coercive persuasion and its treatment.

Wellspring has been praised by Christian countercultist Dr. Ronald Enroth, in his best-selling book Churches That Abuse, as well as in the follow-up book, Recovering From Churches That Abuse. In the latter he wrote, in part:
Wellspring exists because recovering emotionally, restoring a loving relationship with God, and re-entering society are not easily accomplished on one's own. The accounts in this book reveal how tortuous the path to recovery can be without professional, caring help. The tragedy is that for the victims of spiritual abuse, the options are disappointingly few. Not many programs are especially equipped, as Wellspring is, to treat victims of spiritual abuse.

Criticism
Jeffrey Hadden said former Wellspring clients have told him the retreat uses some of the very thought reform techniques it attributes to cults.

References

Organizations established in 1986
Former members of Evangelical parachurch organizations
Non-profit organizations based in Ohio
Christian countercult organizations
501(c)(3) organizations